Przysiecz  (German: Przyschetz, 1931–1945 Lichtenwalde) is a village in the administrative district of Gmina Prószków, within Opole County, Opole Voivodeship, in south-western Poland.

The village has a population of 563.

References

Przysiecz